Hermanus 'Herman' Jacobus Coster (Alkmaar, the Netherlands, 30 June 1865 - Elandslaagte, South African Republic, 21 October 1899) was a Dutch lawyer and State Attorney of the Zuid-Afrikaansche Republiek.

Biography 

Herman Coster was born on 30 June 1865 in Alkmaar in the Netherlands. He went to school at the H.B.S. in Alkmaar, and the Stedelijk Gymnasium in Leiden. After, he studied law at the Leiden University, where he became president of the student corps. His uncle, a Hague-based doctor, T.H. Blom Coster, was the patron of his studies. As a student Herman Coster sympathized with the Young Flemish Movement. He completed his PhD in 1890 writing his thesis on Public Voluntary Auctions.

He moved to the South African Republic after his family experienced bankruptcy. Here he became a lawyer, and between 1895-1897, at request of President Paul Kruger, he served as state attorney. After Kruger insulted the 'Hollanders', Coster resigned his position and returned to working as a lawyer.

During the South African War (1899-1902), Coster joined the Hollanderkorps: a voluntary unit of Boer foreign volunteers consisting of 130 men and which had been established a mere month earlier. The Battle of Elandslaagte was both the first and last battle that the Corps participated in. Coster, then a lieutenant, was killed at the Battle of Elandslaagte, along with fellow officer Cars Geerts de Jonge and seven soldiers: P.J. van den Broek, H. van Cittert, J.A. Lepeltak Kieft, Jan Moora, J.Th. Rummeling, M. Schaink, and F.W. Wagner. Another 35 of others were taken prisoner, among them Willem Frederik Mondriaan (brother of the Dutch artist Piet Mondrian). The names of the deceased, including Coster, were inscribed at a monument at the location of the battle. The monument was destroyed by vandals in 2014.

After his death, Coster was lauded as a hero in the Netherlands and several hagiographies were published. In 1900 the Herman Coster Fund was established in Leiden for Afrikaans and Dutch students. In November 1901 a plaque commemorating Coster was added to the Leiden Academiegebouw.

Hermanus Coster Street in The Hague was named after Coster in 1904. This street is located in the Transvaal neighbourhood of The Hague that was established at this time. In 1915 the name was changed to Herman Coster Street. Today this is the location of the Haagse Markt. Another Herman Coster Street is located nearby in Wassenaar. Coster's hometown of Alkmaar also has a street named after him. There are also streets named after Coster in the Transvaal neighbourhoods of Leeuwarden and Rotterdam, as well as in Pretoria in South Africa.

Coster and the Hollanderkorps were featured as part of the exhibition 'Good Hope: South Africa and the Netherlands from 1600' held at the Rijksmuseum in Amsterdam in 2017.

Gallery

See also 
Dutch Corps Monument

References

1865 births
1899 deaths
Dutch expatriates in South Africa
19th-century Dutch lawyers
Leiden University alumni
People from Alkmaar
19th-century South African lawyers
Boer military personnel of the Second Boer War
Military personnel killed in the Second Boer War